Aksdal Church is a parish church of the Church of Norway in Aksdal village, Tysvær Municipality, Rogaland county, Norway. It is one of the two churches for the Førresfjorden parish, which is part of the Haugaland prosti (deanery) in the Diocese of Stavanger. The red brick church was built in a long church style in 1995 using designs by architect Stein Jarle Helgeland. It seats about 450 people.

See also
List of churches in Rogaland

References

Tysvær
Churches in Rogaland
Brick churches in Norway
20th-century Church of Norway church buildings
Churches completed in 1995
1995 establishments in Norway